Heikki Juhani Hannikainen (1915–1989) was a Finnish diplomat, a master of philosophy. He was an ambassador in Peru, Venezuela and Colombia between 1963 and 1967, as Ambassador of Foreign Affairs in 1968–1972 and Ambassador in Madrid from 1972 to 1978.

In 1968, he received a diplomatic title of Specialty and Plenipotentiary Minister.

References 

Ambassadors of Finland to Venezuela
Ambassadors of Finland to Peru
Ambassadors of Finland to Colombia
1915 births
1989 deaths
Ambassadors of Finland to Spain